In Greek mythology, Cadmus was the legendary Phoenician founder of Boeotian Thebes. He was, alongside Perseus and Bellerophon, the greatest hero and slayer of monsters before the days of Heracles.  Commonly stated to be a prince of Phoenicia, the son of king Agenor and queen Telephassa of Tyre, the brother of Phoenix, Cilix and Europa, Cadmus could trace his origins back to Zeus. Originally, he was sent by his royal parents to seek out and escort his sister Europa back to Tyre after she was abducted from the shores of Phoenicia by Zeus. In early accounts, Cadmus and Europa were instead the children of Phoenix. Cadmus founded or refounded the Greek city of Thebes, the acropolis of which was originally named Cadmeia in his honour.

Cadmus' homeland was the subject of significant disagreement among ancient authors. Apollodorus identifies it as Phoenicia, but Tyre, Sidon, and even Thebes in Egypt are referenced in different accounts. His parentage is sometimes modified to suit, e.g. claims of Theban origin name his mother as one of the daughters of Nilus, one of the Potamoi and deity of the Nile river.

Overview

Cadmus was credited by the Greek historian Herodotus with introducing the original Phoenician alphabet to the Greeks, who adapted it to form their Greek alphabet. Modern scholarship has almost unanimously agreed with Herodotus concerning the Phoenician source of the alphabet.

Herodotus estimates that Cadmus lived sixteen hundred years before his time, which would be around 2000 BC. Herodotus had seen and described the Cadmean writing in the temple of Apollo at Thebes engraved on certain tripods. He estimated those tripods to date back to the time of Laius the great-grandson of Cadmus. On one of the tripods there was this inscription in Cadmean writing, which, as he attested, resembled Ionian letters:  ("Amphitryon dedicated me from the spoils of [the battle of] Teleboae.").

Although Greeks like Herodotus dated Cadmus's role in the founding myth of Thebes to well before the Trojan War (or, in modern terms, during the Aegean Bronze Age), this chronology conflicts with most of what is now known or thought to be known about the origins and spread of both the Phoenician and Greek alphabets. The earliest Greek inscriptions match Phoenician letter forms from the late 9th or 8th centuries BC—in any case, the Phoenician alphabet properly speaking was not developed until around 1050 BC (or after the Bronze Age collapse). The Homeric picture of the Mycenaean age betrays extremely little awareness of writing, possibly reflecting the loss during the Dark Age of the earlier Linear B script. Indeed, the only Homeric reference to writing was in the phrase "σήματα λυγρά", sēmata lugra, literally "baneful signs", when referring to the Bellerophontic letter. Linear B tablets have been found in abundance at Thebes, which might lead one to speculate that the legend of Cadmus as bringer of the alphabet could reflect earlier traditions about the origins of Linear B writing in Greece (as Frederick Ahl speculated in 1967).

According to Greek myth, Cadmus's descendants ruled at Thebes on and off for several generations, including the time of the Trojan War.

Etymology
The etymology of Cadmus' name remains uncertain. According to one view, the name originates from Phoenician, from the Semitic root qdm, which signifies "the east", the equation of Kadmos with the Semitic qdm was traced to a publication of 1646 by R. B. Edwards. According to another view, the name is of Greek origin, ultimately from the word kekasmenos..

Possible connected words include the Semitic triliteral root qdm which signifies "east" in Ugaritic, in Arabic, words derived from the root "qdm" include the verb "qdm" meaning "to come" as well as words meaning "primeval" and "forth" as well as "foot", names derived from it are "Qadim", which means "he who advances" and "of antiquity",  ─ in Hebrew, qedem means "front", "east" and "ancient times"; the verb qadam means "to be in front", and the Greek kekasmai (<*kekadmai) "to shine". Therefore, the complete meaning of the name might be: "He who excels" or "from the east".

Wanderings

Travel to Samothrace

After his sister Europa had been carried off by Zeus from the shores of Phoenicia, Cadmus was sent out by his father to find her, and enjoined not to return without her. Unsuccessful in his search—or unwilling to go against Zeus—he came to Samothrace, the island sacred to the "Great Gods" or the Kabeiroi, whose mysteries would be celebrated also at Thebes.

Cadmus did not journey alone to Samothrace; he appeared with his mother Telephassa in the company of his nephew (or brother) Thasus, son of Cilix, who gave his name to the island of Thasos nearby. An identically composed trio had other names at Samothrace, according to Diodorus Siculus: Electra and her two sons, Dardanos and Eetion or Iasion. There was a fourth figure, Electra's daughter, Harmonia, whom Cadmus took away as a bride, as Zeus had abducted Europa.

The wedding was the first celebrated on Earth to which the gods brought gifts, according to Diodorus and dined with Cadmus and his bride.

Founder of Thebes
 
Cadmus came in the course of his wanderings to Delphi, where he consulted the oracle. He was ordered to give up his quest and follow a special cow, with a half moon on her flank, which would meet him, and to build a town on the spot where she should lie down exhausted.

The cow was given to Cadmus by Pelagon, King of Phocis, and it guided him to Boeotia, where he founded the city of Thebes.

Intending to sacrifice the cow to Athena, Cadmus sent some of his companions, Deioleon and Seriphus to the nearby Ismenian spring for water. They were slain by the spring's guardian water-dragon (compare the Lernaean Hydra), which was in turn destroyed by Cadmus, the duty of a culture hero of the new order.

He was then instructed by Athena to sow the dragon's teeth in the ground, from which there sprang a race of fierce armed men, called the Spartoi ("sown"). By throwing a stone among them, Cadmus caused them to fall upon one another until only five survived, who assisted him to build the Cadmeia or citadel of Thebes, and became the founders of the noblest families of that city.

The dragon had been sacred to Ares, so the god made Cadmus do penance for eight years by serving him. According to Theban tellings, it was at the expiration of this period that the gods gave him Harmonia ("harmony", literally "putting or assembling together", "good assembly", or "good composition") as wife. At Thebes, Cadmus and Harmonia began a dynasty with a son Polydorus, and four daughters, Agave, Autonoë, Ino and Semele. In rare account, the couple instead had six daughters which are called the Cadmiades: Ino, Agaue, Semele, Eurynome, Kleantho and Eurydike.

At the wedding, whether celebrated at Samothrace or at Thebes, all the gods were present; Harmonia received as bridal gifts a peplos worked by Athena and a necklace made by Hephaestus. This necklace, commonly referred to as the Necklace of Harmonia, brought misfortune to all who possessed it. Notwithstanding the divinely ordained nature of his marriage and his kingdom, Cadmus lived to regret both: his family was overtaken by grievous misfortunes, and his city by civil unrest. Cadmus finally abdicated in favor of his grandson Pentheus, and went with Harmonia to Illyria, to fight on the side of the Enchelii. Later, as king, he founded the city of Lychnidos and Bouthoe.

Nevertheless, Cadmus was deeply troubled by the ill-fortune which clung to him as a result of his having killed the sacred dragon, and one day he remarked that if the gods were so enamoured of the life of a serpent, he might as well wish that life for himself. Immediately he began to grow scales and change in form. Harmonia, seeing the transformation, thereupon begged the gods to share her husband's fate, which they granted (Hyginus).

In another telling of the story, the bodies of Cadmus and his wife were changed after their deaths; the serpents watched their tomb while their souls were translated to the fields. In Euripides' The Bacchae, Cadmus is given a prophecy by Dionysus whereby both he and his wife will be turned into snakes for a period before eventually being brought to live among the blest.

Genealogy 
Cadmus was of ultimately divine ancestry, the grandson of the sea god Poseidon and Libya on his father's side, and of Nilus (the River Nile) on his mother's side; overall he was considered a member of the fifth generation of beings following the (mythological) creation of the world:

Offspring
With Harmonia, he was the father of Semele, Polydorus, Autonoe, Agave and Ino. Their youngest son was Illyrius. According to Greek mythology, Cadmus is the ancestor of Illyrians and Theban royalty.

Samothracian connection 
The fact that Hermes was worshipped in Samothrace under the name of Cadmus or Cadmilus seems to show that the Theban Cadmus was interpreted as an ancestral Theban hero corresponding to the Samothracian. Another Samothracian connection for Cadmus is offered via his wife Harmonia, who is said by Diodorus Siculus to be daughter of Zeus and Electra and of Samothracian birth.

Modern scholarship

Origins of Cadmus and his myth 
The question of Cadmus' eastern origin have been debated for a long time in modern scholarship.

Homer mentions Cadmus only once, but he had already referred to the inhabitants of Thebes with the name "Cadmeans". Aeschylus and Sophocles, in particular, repeatedly mention the "city of Cadmus" and "Cadmeans", relating Thebes with Cadmus. Also Euripides linked Thebes with Cadmus, but he was one of the earliest authors and the only tragedian to mention "Cadmus the Tyrian". Herodotus refers to Cadmus the Tyrian, and he was the first to mention Cadmus' 'Phoenician' origins, but he certainly was not the initiator of this transformation, as his Histories provides evidence that the myth was already widespread. Since Herodotus Cadmus has been commonly described as a prince of Phoenicia. According to Diodorus Siculus (1st century BC), Cadmus had Theban origins.

Modern historian Albert Schachter has suggested that Cadmus was a fictitious hero named after the Thebean acropolis and was made 'Phoenician' due to the influence of immigrants from the East to Boeotia. According to M. L. West the myth of Cadmus and Harmonia at Thebes originated from 9th or 8th century BC Phoenician residents in the city. According to Jason Colavito, although modern scholars have debated on whether the myth came from Phoenicia, there is evidence that the core of Cadmus's myth originated in Near Eastern stories of the battle between a hero and a dragon. The myth of Cadmus the Phoenician was not a literal reinterpretation of an original Phoenician myth, although being probably inspired by one, rather it was the Greeks' interpretation of the Phoenician civilization and the benefits they acquired from it, specifically the alphabet. According to archaeologist John Boardman, the "Phoenicians" who came with Cadmus, were not "Phoenicians", but rather Greeks who had lived in the Near East for a while and had returned to teach what they had learned there, including the alphabet.

Given the absence of a Phoenician colony in Thebes, several hypotheses arguing against Cadmus' eastern origin have been proposed by modern scholars:

Mycenaean hypothesis
According to historian Frederick M. Ahl, scholarly suggestions that Cadmus was a Mycenaean must be taken into account against Cadmus' Phoenician origin, as for him it is becoming harder and harder to reconcile literary and archaeological evidence, not to mention epigraphical difficulties. Ahl rather suggest that "Cadmus was a Mycenaean, and the writing he brought to Thebes was Linear B, which may have been known to Greek-speaking peoples then or later as φοινικήια γράμματα."

Cretan hypothesis
Henry Hall set forth an hypothesis, arguing that Cadmus and the Cadmeians came from Crete. There are a number of difficulties involved in this hypothesis, however, notably the assertion that Mycenaean society resulted from the triumph of the Minoan civilization over the mainland one.

Argive hypothesis
Cadmus was used as an identification figure by the Argives, representing an intriguing example of mythical requisition in relation to the wars between Argos and Thebes. According to the Argive legend, Cadmus' father Agenor was descended from the Argive princess Io. In this light, Cadmus becomes an Argive and Thebes his "home away from home", which is connected with the emergence of hybrid identities during the period of the Great Colonization.

Hittite records controversy 
It has been argued by various scholars, that in a letter from the King of Ahhiyawa to the Hittite King, written in the Hittite language in c. 1250 BC, a specific Cadmus was mentioned as a forefather of the Ahhijawa people. The latter term most probably referred to the Mycenaean world (Achaeans), or at least to a part of it. Nevertheless, this reading about a supposed Cadmus as historical person is rejected by most scholars.

Trivia
The Syrian city of Al-Qadmus is named after Cadmus.

See also
Cadmium
Cadmus of Miletus
Cadmean victory
Cadmean vixen
Theban kings in Greek mythology

Notes

Citations

Sources 

Hyginus. Fabulae, 178.
Apollodorus, III, i, 1-v, 4;
Ovid. Metamorphoses, III, 1-137; IV, 563-603.
Homer. The Odyssey, 5.333.

References

Primary sources
Apollodorus, The Library with an English Translation by Sir James George Frazer, F.B.A., F.R.S. in 2 Volumes, Cambridge, MA, Harvard University Press; London, William Heinemann Ltd. 1921. ISBN 0-674-99135-4. Online version at the Perseus Digital Library. Greek text available from the same website.
Gaius Julius Hyginus, Fabulae from The Myths of Hyginus translated and edited by Mary Grant. University of Kansas Publications in Humanistic Studies. Online version at the Topos Text Project.
Homer, The Odyssey with an English Translation by A.T. Murray, PH.D. in two volumes. Cambridge, MA., Harvard University Press; London, William Heinemann, Ltd. 1919. . Online version at the Perseus Digital Library. Greek text available from the same website.
Publius Ovidius Naso, Metamorphoses translated by Brookes More (1859-1942). Boston, Cornhill Publishing Co. 1922. Online version at the Perseus Digital Library.
Publius Ovidius Naso, Metamorphoses. Hugo Magnus. Gotha (Germany). Friedr. Andr. Perthes. 1892. Latin text available at the Perseus Digital Library.

Secondary sources 

Theoi Project

Kerenyi, Karl. The Heroes of the Greeks, 1959.
Vian, F. Les origines de Thébes: Cadmos et les Spartes. Paris, 1963.
R. B. Edwards. Kadmos, the Phoenician: A Study in Greek Legends and the Mycenaean Age. Amsterdam, 1979.
T. Gantz. Early Greek Myth., Volume 2, 467–73.
Matia Rocchi. Kadmos e Harmonia: un matrimonio problemmatico. Rome, Bretschneider, 1989.
 Svetlana Janakieva, "Lе Mythe de Cadmos et l'aire ethnolinguistique paleobalkanique," Thracia, 11, 1995 (= Studia in honorem Alexandri Fol. Sofia, 1995).

Further reading

External links

 Cadmus in painting

Agenorides
Dragonslayers
Greek mythological heroes
Princes in Greek mythology
Theban kings
Kings in Greek mythology
Founding monarchs
Mythological city founders
Metamorphoses characters
Metamorphoses into animals in Greek mythology
Phoenician characters in Greek mythology
Deeds of Zeus
Deeds of Athena
Theban mythology
Deeds of Ares